Oxfordshire Day is celebrated on 19 October to promote the historic English county of Oxfordshire. It is also the principal feast day of the patron saint of the city and university of Oxford, St Frideswide. 

The commemoration of St Frideswide's Day was encouraged in the nineteenth century by Henry Liddell, Dean of Christ Church. The feast day now appears in the calendars of the Diocese of Oxford and the Roman Catholic Ordinariate of Our Lady of Walsingham. Each year there is a civic service to celebrate St Frideswide's Day in Christ Church Cathedral, Oxford, which houses her shrine.

See also

 Flag of Oxfordshire
 List of county days in the United Kingdom
 St Piran's Day
 Yorkshire Day
 Sussex Day

References

October observances
Events in Oxfordshire
Annual events in England